Gábor Benedek (born 23 March 1927) is a Hungarian modern pentathlete and Olympic champion.

Benedek won a gold medal in the modern pentathlon at the 1952 Summer Olympics in Helsinki with the Hungarian team.

References

External links 
 
 
 
 

1927 births
Living people
Hungarian male modern pentathletes
Olympic modern pentathletes of Hungary
Modern pentathletes at the 1952 Summer Olympics
Modern pentathletes at the 1956 Summer Olympics
Olympic gold medalists for Hungary
Olympic silver medalists for Hungary
Olympic medalists in modern pentathlon
Sportspeople from Jász-Nagykun-Szolnok County
World Modern Pentathlon Championships medalists
Medalists at the 1952 Summer Olympics
People from Tiszaföldvár